Les "Buzz" Parsons (born 16 December 1950) is a Canadian former soccer player who played at both professional and international levels as a midfielder. During his career in North America with the Vancouver Whitecaps, Parsons was affectionately known as "White Shoes", owing to the white boots he wore. After retiring as a player, Parsons later became a professional soccer coach.

Career

Club career
Parsons played youth football in England with Huddersfield Town and Ipswich Town, but he never made a senior league appearance for either team. Parsons returned to Canada to play with the Vancouver Spartans and Vancouver Eintracht, winning the Challenge Cup with Eintracht in 1971. He also played with Vancouver Italia (Columbus FC) in 1972–1974. He spent one year (1975) studying and playing at Simon Fraser University, netting 21 goals.

Parsons later played in the North American Soccer League for the Vancouver Whitecaps between 1976 and 1982, scoring 17 goals in 106 appearances. Parsons started at right back in the 1979 NASL championship game that the Whitecaps won 2–1. Parsons also played indoor soccer during this period for the Los Angeles Aztecs and the Whitecaps.

International career
Between 1972 and 1980, Parsons represented Canada on 22 occasions, scoring 6 goals in the process. He also represented Canada at the 1971 Pan American Games.

International goals
Scores and results list Canada's goal tally first.

Coaching career
Parsons was manager of the Vancouver 86ers and then the Victoria Vistas of the Canadian Soccer League.

Personal life
Parsons was born in Burnaby, British Columbia.

In 2003 Parsons was inducted into the Canadian Soccer Hall of Fame.

Parsons now lives in Victoria, B.C., playing Over 50's soccer at Gorge Soccer Association

References

External links
 / Canada Soccer Hall of Fame

1950 births
Living people
Canadian expatriate soccer players
Canadian expatriate sportspeople in England
Canada men's international soccer players
Canada Soccer Hall of Fame inductees
Pan American Games competitors for Canada
Footballers at the 1971 Pan American Games
Canadian soccer players
Expatriate footballers in England
Association football defenders
Association football midfielders
Association football forwards
Los Angeles Aztecs players
North American Soccer League (1968–1984) indoor players
North American Soccer League (1968–1984) players
Simon Fraser Clan men's soccer players
Simon Fraser University alumni
Soccer people from British Columbia
Sportspeople from Burnaby
Vancouver Columbus players
Vancouver Spartans players
Vancouver Whitecaps (1974–1984) players
Victoria Riptides players
Western Soccer Alliance players